Chloe Kim (born April 23, 2000) is an American snowboarder and two-time Olympic gold medalist. At the 2018 Winter Olympics, she became the youngest woman to win an Olympic snowboarding gold medal when she won gold in the women's snowboard halfpipe at 17 years old.

At the 2022 Beijing Winter Olympics, she became the first woman to win two gold medals in halfpipe. She is a six-time X Games gold medalist and the first woman to win two gold medals in snowboarding at the Winter Youth Olympic Games. She is the World, Olympic, Youth Olympic, and X Games champion in the halfpipe and the first to win the title at all four major events.

Early life
Kim was born on April 23, 2000, in Long Beach, California and raised in nearby Torrance. She has two older sisters, Erica and Tracy. Her parents are from South Korea. Kim's father started her on a snowboard at age four at the southern California resort of Mountain High; she started competing at age six as a member of Team Mountain High. She spent third and fourth grade studying and training in Geneva, Switzerland where her aunt lived, before returning to California and training at Mammoth Mountain. She is fluent in French, English, and Korean. Kim's father quit his job to drive her to the mountains and also to be able to travel with her when she competes. Chloe Kim went to Dana Middle School. Kim joined the U.S. Snowboarding Team in 2013.

Career

X Games

While too young to compete in the 2014 Sochi Winter Olympics, Kim earned a silver medal in superpipe in the 2014 Winter X Games behind Kelly Clark. In 2015, Chloe won Gold in the superpipe at the Winter X Games, besting Clark. With this win, at age 14, Kim became the youngest gold medalist until she lost the record to Kelly Sildaru, who won gold in 2016 at the age of 13. In the 2016 X Games, she became the first person under the age of 16 to win two gold medals (and also the first person to win back-to-back gold medals) at an X Games. At that year's U.S. Snowboarding Grand Prix, Kim became the first woman to land back-to-back 1080 spins in a snowboarding competition. She scored a perfect 100 points and is the second rider ever to do so, after Shaun White.

2016 Winter Youth Olympics

In 2016, Kim became the first American woman to win a gold medal in snowboarding at the Winter Youth Olympic Games and earned the highest snowboarding score in Youth Olympic Games history. She was selected as Team USA's flag bearer for the Opening Ceremony of the 2016 Winter Youth Olympic Games, becoming the first snowboarder chosen to serve as flag bearer for Team USA at either the Olympic Winter Games or Youth Olympic Games. Kim was nominated for the 2016 ESPYS award for Best Breakthrough Athlete.

2018 Winter Olympics

At Kim's first Winter Olympics in  Pyeongchang, South Korea, she won the gold medal in the Women's Halfpipe finals with Ricky Bower as her coach. Her first score was 93.75 points, which was 8.5 points ahead of second place. Her last half-pipe score was close to a perfect score at 98.25 points. She was nearly 10 points ahead of Liu Jiayu, who placed second. Kim became the youngest woman to ever land two 1080-degree spins in a row at the Olympics. At age 17, she became the youngest woman to ever win gold at the Olympics in the halfpipe, surpassing the past record holder, Kelly Clark, who had won the gold when she was 19. This record landed Kim a position on Time magazine's annual Time 100 list.

2022 Winter Olympics

Kim became a two-time Olympian when she competed at her second consecutive Winter Olympics in Beijing, China. Kim entered the women's halfpipe event. She successfully defended her Olympic title, thus becoming the first female snowboarder to win back-to-back gold medals at the snowboard halfpipe event.

After qualifying for the final in first place with a score of 87.75, achieved in her first run, Kim won the event with a score of 94.00, also achieved in her first run. She used her additional two runs in the final to attempt a new trick, but in both attempts was unable to stick the landing. As a result, her scores for the second and third runs were low (27.00 and 26.25, respectively) and thus discarded, with the score from her first run counted to secure the Olympic title.

In popular culture
Kim was featured on the cover of Sports Illustrated following her Olympic gold medal win. Her appearance on a special edition of the Kellogg's Corn Flakes box set a new record for "fastest-selling cereal box in Kellogg Company history."

In 2018, Mattel began producing a Shero Barbie in her likeness in a new line of dolls highlighting inspiring women (that also includes Amelia Earhart). In February 2019, Kim was featured in Nike's "Dream Crazier" ad with Serena Williams, Simone Biles, Ibtihaj Muhammad, Megan Rapinoe, and other women athletes. The ad appeared during the 2019 Oscars.

In late 2020, Kim competed on season 4 of The Masked Singer as "Jellyfish". Kim ultimately made it to the semi-finals of the competition before being unmasked in a triple elimination alongside Tori Kelly as "Seahorse" and Taylor Dayne as "Popcorn".

In March 2022, she was added to the game Fortnite as a playable character as part of the game's icon series.

Awards and honors
In July 2018, Kim won three ESPYs for Best Female Athlete, Best Female Olympian, and Best Female Action Sports Athlete.

Kim was also included in Time magazine's 100 Most Influential People of 2018.

Personal life
Kim was admitted to Princeton University in 2018 but deferred the offer of admission until 2019. She struggled with her fame at Princeton for a period of time, and decided to return to competitive snowboarding prior to the 2022 Olympics.

Family
Kim is a second-generation Korean-American; her parents, Boran Yun Kim and Jong Jin Kim, emigrated from South Korea during the country's authoritarian era. Her father first arrived with just $800 in cash and worked minimum-wage jobs, eventually earning a college degree at the El Camino College in manufacturing engineering technology. He eventually quit his job to help his daughter pursue her snowboarding career.

Kim has extended family living in South Korea, where she competed in the 2018 Winter Olympics. Her relatives, including her grandmother, watched her compete for the first time at the Olympics. Kim stated, "I have this different opportunity because I'm Korean-American, but I'm riding for the States. ... I'm starting to understand that I can represent both countries."

Anti-Asian Racism

Kim stated that despite being born in the United States and having always represented the country professionally at international events, she experiences racist and hateful messages regularly, up to 30 a day, as far back as she was age 13. She stated that because she was Asian, people would often belittle her accomplishments, telling her to "stop taking medals away from the white American girls on the team", as well as to "go back to China".

She has also spoken up about the rise of anti-Asian hate crime and violence in the country since the COVID-19 pandemic, adding that she is constantly worried about her parents' safety. She added that she would always bring along a knife, pepper spray, and tasers whenever she goes outdoors to do her errands as well as avoiding crowded places in general.

Filmography

Television

Film

Music videos

See also
List of Olympic medalists in snowboarding
List of Youth Olympic Games gold medalists who won Olympic gold medals

References

External links

 
 

2000 births
American female snowboarders
American people of South Korean descent
American sportspeople of Korean descent
Snowboarders at the 2016 Winter Youth Olympics
Living people
Medalists at the 2018 Winter Olympics
Medalists at the 2022 Winter Olympics
Olympic gold medalists for the United States in snowboarding
Snowboarders at the 2018 Winter Olympics
Snowboarders at the 2022 Winter Olympics
Sportspeople from Long Beach, California
Sportspeople from Torrance, California
X Games athletes
Laureus World Sports Awards winners
Youth Olympic gold medalists for the United States
21st-century American women